Clementi may refer to:

People
 Aldo Clementi (1925–2011), Italian composer
 Cecil Clementi (1875–1947), British colonial administrator, Governor of Hong Kong and Straits Settlements
 Cecilia Clementi, Italian-American scientist
 David Clementi (born 1949), British business executive, deputy governor of the Bank of England, and chairman of the BBC
 Enrico Clementi (born 1931), Italian computational chemist
 Muzio Clementi (1752–1832), Italian/English composer
 Rich Clementi, American mixed martial artist
 Suicide of Tyler Clementi, 2010 incident in which a college student committed suicide after his sexual encounter with another man was video-streamed over the internet

Other
 Clementi, Singapore, a neighbourhood of Singapore
 Clementi MRT station, Singapore
 Clementi Police Division, a police division of the Singapore Police Force
 Clementi Public Library, a public library in Singapore
 Clementi Town Secondary School, a secondary school in Singapore
 Clementi Secondary School, a secondary school in North Point, Hong Kong 

Italian-language surnames
Patronymic surnames
Surnames from given names